La Goutelle is a commune in the Puy-de-Dôme department in Auvergne in central France.

Geography
La Goutelle is situated some 30 km west of Clermont Ferrand, on the old N141 running from Royan on the Atlantic coast all the way across France. The road, now renamed the D941, has lost its national importance but still remains the principal route linking Clermont Ferrand to Limoges.

Economy
La Goutelle is part of the canton of Pontgibaud, and like Pontgibaud relied on mining as its major source of income until the early 20th Century. Nowadays milk production, forestry, passing trade for its bars and restaurants and the export of labour to Clermont Ferrand and the Ancizes form La Goutelle's economy. La Goutelle has managed to retain several shops, bars and restaurants and has a regionally renowned boulangerie. La Goutelle has a municipal campsite though it only tends to be occupied in the weeks surrounding the Fête Patronale.

Population
The 2010 census reported a population of 610 inhabitants in La Goutelle (with 520 registered voters, not all full-time residents). More than 20 of La Goutelle's constituent "villages" are inhabited. Le Bourg has around 250 inhabitants. Ossebet, Ballot, Salmondeche are the larger outlying villages.

Culture
It shares primary school services with neighbouring St. Jacques d'Ambur and has joined the "communité de communes" Pontgibaud, Sioule & Volcans in 2010. Its football team is currently incorporated into Association Sportive Pontgibaud - La Goutelle. Although all home games are played at La Goutelle, the last Goutellois player left the club in 2007. ASPLG went into "sommeil" ("sleep" - a temporary suspension) at the end of the 2009/2010 season. In common with most of the villages of the Combrailles, there is an active Comité des Fetes which amongst other responsibilities, runs the Fete Patronale - always the first weekend of August (2010, 30 July to 2 August).

Administration
Since 2014 the mayor of La Goutelle is Frédéric Saby, who was re-elected in 2020.

See also
Communes of the Puy-de-Dôme department

References

Goutelle